Broadgreen (officially Broad Green) is an eastern suburb of Liverpool, Merseyside, England. On the edge of the city, it is bordered by Old Swan to the north-west, Knotty Ash to the north-east, Childwall to the south and, further east, Bowring Park. Until 2004, it was a Liverpool City Council ward.

Description
Historically a part of Lancashire, Broadgreen is primarily a residential area, made up of semi-detached and detached houses. As a small district, it is often counted with Childwall or Knotty Ash which are larger suburbs of the city. It is home to Broadgreen Hospital, Broadgreen Primary School and Dixons Broadgreen Academy.

Broadgreen covers an area of just over a square mile (2.97 km2) and in the 2001 Census had a population of 14,889 (6,919 males and 7,970 females).

Transport
Situated close to the end of the M62 motorway, the area is served by Broad Green railway station, where regular trains depart for Liverpool city centre, Manchester, Wigan and St Helens.

References

External links

 Liverpool Street Gallery - Liverpool 14

Areas of Liverpool